Hillside School District may refer to:
 Hillside Elementary School District in Arizona
 Hillside School District 93 in Illinois
 Hillside Public Schools in New Jersey